Bilanga is a department or commune of Gnagna Province in northern Burkina Faso. Its capital is the town of Bilanga.

Towns and villages

References

Departments of Burkina Faso
Gnagna Province